Arethusa (minor planet designation: 95 Arethusa) is a large main-belt asteroid. It was discovered by German astronomer Robert Luther on 23 November 1867, and named after one of the various Arethusas in Greek mythology. Arethusa has been observed occulting a star three times: first on 2 February 1998, and twice in January 2003.

This object is orbiting the Sun with a period of 5.36 years and an eccentricity of 0.15. The cross-section diameter is around 136 km and it is spinning with a rotation period of 8.7 hours. The spectrum matches a C-type asteroid, indicating a dark surface with a primitive carbonaceous composition.

References

External links 
 Asteroid Occultation Results for North America on 2008/04/16 with 2 chords
 
 

Background asteroids
Arethusa
Arethusa
C-type asteroids (Tholen)
Ch-type asteroids (SMASS)
18671123
Objects observed by stellar occultation